The 54th Academy Awards ceremony, organized by the Academy of Motion Picture Arts and Sciences (AMPAS), honored films released in 1981 and took place on March 29, 1982, at the Dorothy Chandler Pavilion in Los Angeles beginning at 6:00 p.m. PST / 9:00 p.m. EST. During the ceremony, AMPAS presented Academy Awards (commonly referred to as Oscars) in 22 categories. The ceremony, televised in the United States by ABC, was produced by Howard W. Koch and directed by Marty Pasetta. Comedian and talk show host Johnny Carson hosted the show for the third consecutive time. One week earlier, in a ceremony held at The Beverly Hilton in Beverly Hills, California, on March 21, the Academy Scientific and Technical Awards were presented by hosts Lloyd Bridges and Fay Kanin.

Chariots of Fire won four awards, including Best Picture. Other winners included Raiders of the Lost Ark with five awards, On Golden Pond and Reds with three, Arthur with two, and An American Werewolf in London, Close Harmony, Crac, Genocide, Mephisto, and Violet with one. The telecast garnered 46.2 million viewers in the United States.

Winners and nominees

The nominees for the 54th Academy Awards were announced on February 11, 1982, by Academy president Fay Kanin and actor Lloyd Bridges. Reds earned the most nominations with 12; On Golden Pond came in second with ten.  The winners were announced at the awards ceremony on March 29. Best Director winner Warren Beatty became the first person to earn acting, directing, producing, and screenwriting nominations for the same film for the second time. He previously earned nominations in the same categories for 1978's Heaven Can Wait. On Golden Pond was the fifth film to win both lead acting awards. Best Actress winner Katharine Hepburn became the first and only performer to win four competitive acting Oscars. Furthermore, the 48-year span between her first win for 1933's Morning Glory and her last win for On Golden Pond, set the record for the longest span between first and last career Oscar nominations.

Awards
Winners are listed first, highlighted in boldface and indicated with a double dagger.

Honorary Academy Award
 Barbara Stanwyck  "For superlative creativity and unique contribution to the art of screen acting."

Jean Hersholt Humanitarian Award
The award recognizes individuals whose humanitarian efforts have brought credit to the motion picture industry.

 Danny Kaye

Irving G. Thalberg Memorial Award
The award honors "creative producers whose bodies of work reflect a consistently high quality of motion picture production".

 Albert R. Broccoli

Special Achievement Academy Award
 Ben Burtt and Richard L. Anderson for the sound effects editing of Raiders of the Lost Ark

Multiple nominations and awards

Presenters and performers
The following individuals, listed in order of appearance, presented awards or performed musical numbers.

Presenters

Performers

Ceremony information

In November 1981, the Academy hired film director, screenwriter, and producer Melvin Frank to produce the telecast for the first time. "The Academy is fortunate that Melvin Frank has agreed to make himself available for our show, said AMPAS President Fay Kanin in a press release announcing the selection. "He joins a distinguished list of producers who have consistently made the Academy Awards the entertainment highlight of the year." Two months later, it was announced that comedian and The Tonight Show host Johnny Carson would preside over emceeing duties for the 1982 ceremony. However, in February 1982, Howard W. Koch took over producing duties after Frank had been hospitalized for complications stemming from a virus. Koch stated that all artistic contributions made by Frank would remain during the production of the festivities.

Introduction of Best Makeup award
Beginning with this ceremony, AMPAS introduced a new competitive award that would honor achievement in makeup. According to Academy executive administrator John Pavlik, the category would be presented if a special committee composed of makeup artists, hairstylists, cinematographers, and other related craftspeople determined that at least one film was deemed worthy of such awards. A maximum of seven films eligible would be needed for the award to be handed out. The committee would determine the number of nominees  with five being the highest possible count. Prior to the introduction of this category, 1964's 7 Faces of Dr. Lao and 1968's Planet of the Apes were given special honorary awards.

Critical reviews
St. Petersburg Times film critic Thomas Sabulis wrote, "The Academy Awards show was a reasonably good television product. The acceptance speeches were thankfully brief and concise." Columnist Janet Maslin of The New York Times remarked, "Thanks largely to the fancifulness of the Academy of Motion Picture Arts and Sciences' voters, Monday night's Oscar presentation was the most exciting in recent years. When the awards show itself is something less than swift or glamorous, which was certainly the case this year, it can still come to life if the voting takes a sufficiently strange turn." St. Petersberg Times critic Thomas Sabulis commented, "The Academy Awards show was a reasonably good television product. The acceptance speeches were thankfully brief and concise. When winners were not present to receive awards, the presenters quickly accepted for them."

Harold Schindler of The Salt Lake Tribune called the ceremony "a three-and-a-half-hour marathon which sparkled in spots, sputtered in others. and featured some of the most uneven casting in the program's history." Austin American-Statesman film critic Patrick Taggart quipped, "Whether or not the awards will be taken more seriously in the future, the ceremony last Monday night certainly had the dreariness one associates with serious events." The Philadelphia Inquirer columnist Desmond Ryan commented that due to many winners being absent from the festivities, "An already dull evening lapsed into long stretches of tedium."

Ratings and reception
The American telecast on ABC drew in an average of 46.2 million people over the length of the entire ceremony, which was a 6% increase from the previous year's ceremony. Moreover, the show drew higher Nielsen ratings compared to the previous ceremony with 33.6% of households watching with a 53% share.

In August 1982, the ceremony presentation received three nominations at the 34th Primetime Emmys. The following month, it won an award for Ray Klausen's art direction of the program.

See also
 List of submissions to the 54th Academy Awards for Best Foreign Language Film

Notes

References

Bibliography

External links
 Academy Awards official website
 The Academy of Motion Picture Arts and Sciences official website
 Oscars' channel on YouTube run by the Academy of Motion Picture Arts and Sciences

Analysis
 1981 Academy Awards Winners and History Filmsite

Other resources
 

Academy Awards ceremonies
1981 film awards
1982 in Los Angeles
1982 in American cinema
March 1982 events in the United States
Academy
Television shows directed by Marty Pasetta